Attack of the Herbals is a 2010 Scottish horror comedy directed by David Keith from a screenplay written by David Ryan Keith, Liam Matheson and Alisdair Cook. It stars Calum Booth, Claire McCulloch, Steve Worsley, Richard Currie, and Liam Matheson.

The film is about a group of locals who try to save Lobster Cove, their sleepy village, from disruption caused by a plan to build a new supermarket complex.

Premise
Set in a small Scottish village named Lobster Cove, the local community is enraged when a retailer is granted permission to build their supermarket complex on a nature spot. A WW2 German crate is discovered washed up on shore and one of the group makes tea out of it.

Some of the local residents band together to create a herbal-tea cottage industry as a way to raise funds to fight the retailer. The tea proves incredibly popular and with its rejuvenating properties the elderly are finding a new lease of life. Unfortunately, there are side-effects.

Cast
 Calum Booth as Jackson McGregor
 Claire McCulloch as Jenny Robertson
 Steve Worsley as Russell Wallace
 Richard Currie as Steve Roadrunner Robertson
 Liam Matheson as Bennett Campbell
 Lee Hutcheon as Danny the Pincer

Production
Attack of the Herbals was filmed in and around Aberdeen, Scotland, on a single Canon 5D with follow focus. Much of the film focuses on the Aberdeen harbour area.

The music is by Leah Kardos, who collaborated with David Keith on previous works,  two short films called "Demonic" and "Dead Funny".

Release
Camelot Entertainment Group have gained distribution rights to Attack of the Herbals. Darknight Pictures, a division of Camelot Entertainment, confirmed they were to auction Attack of the Herbals at the 2011 Cannes Film Festival.

References

External links

 
 Attack of the Herbals at Camelot Entertainment

2011 films
Scottish films
2010s comedy horror films
2011 horror films
British comedy horror films
British zombie comedy films
Nazi zombie films
2011 comedy films
English-language Scottish films
2010s English-language films
2010s British films